Gerald Masters born Gerald Watkiss (February 17, 1955 – February 5, 2007) was a musician, solo artist and songwriter, achieving fame during the late seventies and early eighties.

After releasing four albums, produced by Tony Atkins, as a solo artist between 1977 and 1983, he continued in the music business working as a producer/writer with Island, working with artists including Andy Gibb, Neville Staples and The Equators.  Following this work, he struck up writing partnerships with Aziz Ibrahim (Ex-Simply Red, Stone Roses) and Paul Beard (James Blunt, Robbie Williams, Leona Lewis).  In 2006, Masters decided to write and release his own material again, under the name Rescue Party, a collaboration with fellow co-writer and producer Gareth Rhys Jones.

Additionally, Masters was a writer for TV, most notably composing "A Handful of Smarties", which aired in the UK.

Discography

Albums

Singles

External links
 Gerald Masters website
 Review of "Purgatory & Paradise" album
 Flashman Myspace

1955 births
2007 deaths
Alumni of the Royal Welsh College of Music & Drama